Lobo Antunes is the name of:
 António Lobo Antunes (born 1942), Portuguese writer
 João Lobo Antunes (1944–2016), Portuguese neurosurgeon
  (born 1976), Portuguese actor